Maiden Island, also known as "Maid Island" or "Maiden Islet," is a small private island which is part of the independent nation of Antigua and Barbuda.  

The island contains a total of ten moorings, making it a popular tourist destination for those who enjoy the warm waters of the Caribbean Sea. 

As of 2009, the island was owned by American financial criminal Allen Stanford.

Maiden Island is the site for the largest coral reef restoration project performed with designed artificial reefs called "Reef Balls".  In 2004, approximately 3,500 prefabricated reef modules were deployed on all sides of the island but the primary reef was created on the windward side and was heavily planted with propagated and rescued coral and other marine life.  There were more than 10,000 propagated coral fragments planted on the Reef Balls by the Reef Ball Foundation, a public non-profit NGO that does reef restoration work worldwide.

References

Private islands of Antigua and Barbuda